Events in the year 1599 in Japan.

Incumbents
Monarch: Go-Yōzei

Deaths
April 27 – Maeda Toshiie (b. 1538), general

 
1590s in Japan
Japan
Years of the 16th century in Japan